The men's long jump event  at the 1989 IAAF World Indoor Championships was held at the Budapest Sportcsarnok in Budapest on 4 and 5 March.


Medallists

Results

Qualification
Qualification: 7.70 (Q) or at least 12 best performers (q) qualified for the final.

Final

References

Long jump
Long jump at the World Athletics Indoor Championships